The Miss Oregon competition is a regional scholarship competition and beauty pageant that selects the representative for the US state of Oregon in the Miss America pageant. The annual event includes contestants from across the state and awards scholarships to the participants.

Sophia Takla of Portland was crowned Miss Oregon 2022 on June 18, 2022 at Seaside Civic and Convention Center in Seaside. She competed for the title of Miss America 2023 at the Mohegan Sun in Uncasville, Connecticut in December 2022 where she placed in the Top 11.

Gallery of past titleholders

History
The event began in 1947 as the Miss Oregon Pageant and was founded by the merchants in the coastal city of Seaside. Miss Oregon was designated the official State Hostess in 1969. In 2001, Katie Harman was crowned Miss Oregon and went on to win the Miss America crown, becoming the only Miss Oregon winner of the national event. The event is now titled the Miss Oregon Scholarship Pageant.

The event is held at the Seaside Civic and Convention Center at the Oregon Coast with local Seaside merchants as the primary sponsors of the annual contest. The two-day event narrows the competition down to ten finalists on the first day before selecting a winner on the second day. Events at the event include an evening wear competition, talent competition, a fitness competition, and an interview. The competition includes an interview on-stage as the final portion before a winner is selected.

In addition to the chance to become Miss America, the winner also receives scholarships. Contests range in age from 18 to 28, and must first win local competitions or compete at large before qualifying for the Miss Oregon contest.

Results summary
The following is a visual summary of the past results of Miss Oregon titleholders at the national Miss America pageants/competitions. The year in parentheses indicates the year of the national competition during which a placement and/or award was garnered, not the year attached to the contestant's state title.

Placements
 Miss America: Katie Harman (2002)
 1st runners-up: Dorothy Mae Johnson (1956), Emily John Orton (1996)
 2nd runners-up: Patricia Regan Leines (1997)
 3rd runners-up: Marjean Kay Langley (1969), Elizabeth Simmons (1994)
 4th runners-up: Abigail Hayes (2022)
 Top 10: Patti Throop (1954), Judith Hansen (1958), Martha Wyatt (1963), Sue Pack (1966), Suzanne Bunker (1978), Julie Ross (1982), Tamara Ann Finch (1998)
 Top 11: Sophia Takla (2023)
 Top 15: Jo Ann Amorde (1947), Joyce Davis (1948), CC Barber (2010), Stephenie Steers (2011)

Awards

Preliminary awards
 Preliminary Lifestyle and Fitness: Patricia Regan Leines (1997), CC Barber (2010)
 Preliminary Private Interview Award: Shivali Kadam (2020)
 Preliminary Talent: Judith Hansen (1958), Patricia Regan Leines (1997), Katie Harman (2002)

Non-finalist awards
 Non-finalist Interview: April Robinson (2004)
 Non-finalist Talent: Rosemary Doolen (1961), Lynn Dee Grenz (1972), Sandra Lynn Herring (1973), Shan Moss (1977), Teresa Richardson (1981), Stephanie "Jill" Wymer (1984), Kari Virding (2008)

Other awards
 Miss Congeniality: N/A
Quality of Life Award Finalists: Lynette Boggs (1990)
 Steinway Talent Award: Tamara Ann Finch (1998)
 STEM Scholarship Award Finalists: Rebecca Anderson (2015)
 Tiffany Phillips Memorial Scholar Athlete Award: Jennifer Sisco-Moore (1999), Angela Reed (2000)

Winners

Notes

References

External links

Miss Oregon official website

Seaside, Oregon
Oregon
Oregon beauty pageants
Symbols of Oregon
Women in Oregon
Recurring events established in 1947
1947 establishments in Oregon
Annual events in Oregon